The TAD Turangga is an Indonesian armored infantry mobility vehicle developed by Tugasanda Defense (TAD). The name means horse in Javanese.

Design
The Turangga is built on the chassis of the Ford 550 Heavy Duty, which is popular to be converted into a military vehicle because of its reliability. Almost everything belongs to the Ford F550, be it the chassis, suspension, steering wheel, brakes, gearbox and transfer case.

The troop transport type (APC) can be loaded with 12 soldiers, including the commander and driver. In this role, Turangga is designed to carry out missions such as rapid raids, peacekeeping operations and convoy escorts. The Turangga can be driven maximum on flat roads up to 110 km / h. The tank capacity reaches 160 liters of diesel which is enough to move it as far as 800 km.

In appearance, Turangga's design seems to be inspired by the Typhoon MRAP made by Streit Group from the United Arab Emirates. However, Turangga does not have the ability to withstand mines like the Typhoon. The level of protection for the steel welded body is STANAG Level 2. The vehicle is equipped with explosion protection with V hull construction. To protect against the effects of explosions, the Turangga is designed with a ground clearance of 650 mm. 

The four wheels adopt the run flat type 20-750 ATR Rubber with the Michelin 333/80R20 brand, meaning that the wheels are also capable of withstanding the brunt of bullets. In addition to providing shooting holes for assault rifles from inside the cabin, there are four points on the side glass and one on the rear window. 

The Turannga's roof also be armed with 7.62 or 12.7 mm machine guns or 40 mm automatic grenade launcher, which is operated manually. It is also possible to equip a remote control weapon station (RCWS).

Recognizing the importance of protecting the fuel tank, this component is covered in a ballistic steel case. The fuel carries the Euro 3 emission standard. To extend the range, 2×20 liter jerry cans with extra fuel can be added. The Turangga 4×4 belonging to Paskhas TNI AU comes complete with U/VHF and HF communication radio, winch, NATO light gun ports in every troop window, and rifle rack.

Variants

 Wheeled APC
 Search and rescue: The SAR version of Turangga uses Mitsubishi New Triton GLS MT Double Cab 4WD as the base. It costed more than Rp9 million. It is 2.5 meters high and has a capacity of 9 people.
Reconnaissance

Users

: Used by Paskhas.

Gallery

References

External links 

 TAD Website

All-wheel-drive vehicles
Off-road vehicles
Armoured cars
Wheeled armoured personnel carriers
Post–Cold War military equipment of Indonesia
Military vehicles introduced in the 2010s
Military vehicles of Indonesia
Armoured personnel carriers of the post–Cold War period